Crows are a licorice candy identical in shape and texture to Dots. Their mascot is a crow with a top hat and cane.

History
Crows were invented in the 1890s by confectioners Henrique Cataldi and Joseph Maison.  The Black Crows trademark was registered in 1911. There is an urban legend that Crows were to be called "Black Rose", but the printer misheard the name as "Black Crows" and printed wrappers with the wrong name on them. This myth has been debunked.

In 1972, Tootsie Roll Industries acquired the Crows brand by purchasing the Mason Division of the Candy Corporation of America.

See also
 List of confectionery brands

References

Tootsie Roll Industries brands

Candy
Liquorice (confectionery)
American confectionery
Products introduced in 1890